Microstoma protractum is a species of cup fungus in the family Sarcoscyphaceae. It was first described as a species of Peziza by Elias Magnus Fries in 1851. American mycologist Bessie B. Kanouse assigned it its current name in 1948. The fungus is found in Europe and North America, where it grows as a saprophyte on partially buried sticks and roots.

References

External links

Sarcoscyphaceae
Fungi described in 1851
Fungi of Europe
Fungi of North America
Taxa named by Elias Magnus Fries